Garbage is an unwanted or undesired material or substance discarded by residents. The term is often used interchangeably with municipal solid waste.

Garbage may also refer to:
Litter, improperly disposed waste products
Garbage (computer science), unreferenced data in a computer's memory
Garbage (band), a rock band
Garbage (album), the band's debut 
Garbage (EP), a 1995 album by the band Autechre
"Garbage", a song by Bill Steele and Pete Seeger
"Garbage", a song by Dir En Grey from Withering to Death
"Garbage", a song by TISM from Machiavelli and the Four Seasons
"Garbage", a song by Tyler, the Creator from The Music of Grand Theft Auto V
Garbage (film), a 2018 Indian erotic drama film

See also
Garbage can, or waste container
Garbage time, sports terminology
Garbology (study of modern refuse and trash)
Waste (disambiguation)
Garbage collection (disambiguation)
Chemical waste